The Captive Primate Safety Act (H.R. 2964) was a bill introduced in the United States House of Representatives by Rep. Eddie Johnson on July 10, 2007. The legislation, had it been enacted, would have modified the Lacey Act Amendments of 1981 to treat nonhuman primates as prohibited wildlife species, allowing exemptions for zoos and research facilities. The bill was passed by the House of Representatives but never received a floor vote in the United States Senate. 

The bill was reintroduced by Rep. Mark Kirk in February 2009 following the widely publicized mauling of Charla Nash by a pet chimpanzee.

Rep. Rob Bishop argued against the bill during the floor debate, noting it would cost $4 million annually and do nothing directly to prevent chimpanzee attacks on humans; he also noted such attacks are relatively rare.  Twenty states and the District of Columbia already had laws banning primates as pets.  On February 23, the House voted 323 to 95 in favor of the bill.  The House version would exempt monkey helpers.

References

Animal testing
United States proposed federal environmental legislation
United States federal legislation articles without infoboxes
Animal welfare and rights legislation in the United States
Wildlife law
Proposed legislation of the 109th United States Congress
Proposed legislation of the 110th United States Congress
Proposed legislation of the 111th United States Congress
Proposed legislation of the 112th United States Congress
Proposed legislation of the 113th United States Congress
Proposed legislation of the 114th United States Congress
Proposed legislation of the 116th United States Congress
Proposed legislation of the 117th United States Congress